Francis Wilfrid Stocks (10 December 1873 – 21 May 1929) was an English cricketer active from 1894 to 1903 who played for Leicestershire. He was born in Market Harborough and died in Framlingham. He appeared in 63 first-class matches as a lefthanded batsman who bowled left arm medium pace. He scored 834 runs with a highest score of 58 and took 208 wickets with a best performance of eight for 22.

Stocks was a son of John Stocks who at that time was vicar of Market Harborough. He was educated at Lancing College, Denstone College and New College, Oxford. He became a schoolteacher and for thirteen years was an assistant master and house-master at Felsted School; then he was headmaster of Framlingham College 1913–1929.

Notes

1873 births
1929 deaths
English cricketers
Leicestershire cricketers
Oxford University cricketers
Gentlemen cricketers
People from Market Harborough
Cricketers from Leicestershire
People educated at Lancing College
People educated at Denstone College
Alumni of New College, Oxford
Schoolteachers from Leicestershire
P. F. Warner's XI cricketers
Oxford University Past and Present cricketers